Schlieren are optical inhomogeneities in transparent media that are not necessarily visible to the human eye. Schlieren physics developed out of the need to produce high-quality lenses devoid of such inhomogeneities. These inhomogeneities are localized differences in optical path length that cause deviations of light rays, especially by refraction. This light deviation can produce localized brightening, darkening, or even color changes in an image, depending on the directions the rays deviate.

History 
Schlieren were first observed by Robert Hooke in 1665 using a large concave lens and two candles.  One candle served as a light source.  The warm air rising from  the second candle provided the schliere.
The conventional schlieren system is credited mostly to German physicist August Toepler, though Jean Bernard Léon Foucault invented the method in 1859 that Toepler improved upon.  Toepler's original system was designed to detect schlieren in glass used to make lenses.  In the conventional schlieren system, a point source is used to illuminate the test section containing the schliere. An image of this light is formed using a converging lens (also called a schlieren lens).  This image is located at the conjugate distance to the lens according to the thin lens equation:

A knife edge at the point source-image location is positioned as to partially block some light from reaching the viewing screen. The illumination of the image is reduced uniformly. A second lens is used to image the test section to the viewing screen. The viewing screen is located a conjugate distance from the plane of the schliere.

The word schlieren originates from the German schliere, meaning "streak".

Schlieren flow visualization 

Schlieren flow visualization is based on the deflection of light by a refractive index gradient  The index gradient is directly related to flow density gradient.  The deflected light is compared to undeflected light at a viewing screen.  The undisturbed light is partially blocked by a knife edge.  The light that is deflected toward or away from the knife edge produces a shadow pattern depending upon whether it was previously blocked or unblocked.  This shadow pattern is a light-intensity representation of the expansions (low density regions) and compressions (high density regions) which characterize the flow.

Schlieren displays 
The schlieren effect is often used in video projector technologies. The basic idea is some device, such as a liquid crystal light valve, is used to produce schlieren distortions in a controlled manner and these are projected on a screen to produce the desired image. Projection display systems such as the now-obsolete Eidophor and Talaria have used variations of this approach as far back as the year 1940.

See also 
 Background-oriented schlieren technique
 Laser schlieren deflectometry
 Mach–Zehnder interferometer
 Moire deflectometry
 Schlieren imaging
 Schlieren photography
 Shadowgraph
 Synthetic schlieren

References

External links 

Background oriented schlieren for flow visualisation in hypersonic impulse facilities
Visualisation of supersonic flows in shock tunnels using Background Oriented Schlieren (BOS) technique
Video on Schlieren photographs
Schlieren on YouTube

Optics
German words and phrases
Articles containing video clips

ja:シュリーレン現象